This is a list of notable painters from, or associated with, Iceland.

A
Ásgrímur Jónsson (1876–1958)

B
Bjarni Jónsson (1934–2008)

E
Erró (born 1932)
Edda Heiðrún Backman (1957–2016)
Einar Hákonarson (born 1945)
Elínborg Halldórsdóttir (born 1962)

G
Gabríela Friðriksdóttir (born 1971)
Georg Guðni Hauksson (1961–2011)
Gunnlaugur Scheving (1904–1972)

H
Haukur Halldórsson (born 1937)
Hringur Jóhannesson (1932–1996)

J
Jóhannes Geir Jónsson (1927–2003)
Jóhannes Sveinsson Kjarval (1885–1972)
Jón Stefánsson (1881–1962) 
Júlíana Sveinsdóttir (1889–1966)

K

Karl Kvaran (1924–1989)
Kristín Jónsdóttir (1888–1959)
Kristján Guðmundsson (born 1941)

L
Louisa Matthíasdóttir (1917–2000)

M
Muggur (1891–1924)

N
Nína Tryggvadóttir (1913–1968)

S
Svavar Guðnason (1909–1988)
Samúel Jónsson (1884–1969)
Sölvi Helgason (1820–1895)

V
Vilhjálmur Einarsson (1934–2019)

Þ
Þórarinn B. Þorláksson (1867–1924)
Þorvaldur Skúlason (1906–1984)

Icelandic painters
Iceland
Painters